White Arkitekter is an architectural firm based in Gothenburg, Sweden. It is the biggest firm in Scandinavia, with more than 900 employees. The company has 16 offices in Sweden, Denmark, Norway and England.

Background
The firm was founded in Gothenburg in 1951 by architects Sidney White (1917–1982) and P. A. Ekholm, and has since established offices in Stockholm, Malmö, Halmstad, Linköping, Örebro, Uppsala, Umeå, Västerås, London, and Oslo. White Arkitekter has a shared ownership model between their employees, with more than 600 shareholders, of which ~130 are partners.

Notable projects

 Skellefteå Culture Centre - Timber high rise which will house a new Culture centre and a hotel and northern Sweden in 2021.
 Relocation of the city centre of Kiruna (2012-2040) - one of the biggest urban transformations of our time. The entire city will be moved approximately 3 km (2 miles) east.
 Kastrup Sea Bath, Denmark (2009) - a 328 foot long pier, redeveloping an industrial, rocky shoreline on the Øresund Strait.
 Väven, Sweden (2014) - Kasper Salin Prize-winning Cultural centre in Umeå designed in collaboration with Norwegian practice Snøhetta.
Umeå East Station, Sweden (2010) Railway station in Umeå built in connection to Bothnia Line (Botniabanan) in Northern Sweden.
New Karolinska Solna University hospital – an ultramodern hospital facility which will open for business in 2018.

Awards
RIBA Regional Awards East 2013 - Southend Pier Cultural Centre, UK
Kasper Salin Prize 2014 - Väven Cultural Centre, Sweden

References

External links
 White.se — Official website

Architecture firms of Sweden
Companies based in Gothenburg
Design companies established in 1951
1951 establishments in Sweden